Mandana Mishra (c. ) was a Hindu philosopher who wrote on the Mīmāṃsā and Advaita systems of thought. He was a follower of the Karma Mimamsa school of philosophy and a staunch defender of the holistic sphota doctrine of language. He was a contemporary of Adi Shankara, and while it is said that he became a disciple of Adi Sankara, he may actually have been the most prominent Advaitin of the two until the 10th century CE. He is often identified with Sureśvara, though the authenticity of this is doubtful. Still, the official Sringeri documents recognises Mandana Mishra as Sureśvara.

Life and scholarship
Maṇḍana Miśhra, who was a contemporary of Shankara, is known to be a student of the Mimamsa scholar Kumarila Bhatta. He wrote several treatises on Mimamsa, but also a work on Advaita, the Brahma-siddhi. Maṇḍana Miśhra probably was more influential in the Advaita Vedanta tradition than is usually acknowledged. According to Richard E. King, 

According to King and Roodurmun, until the 10th century Sankara was overshadowed by his older contemporary Maṇḍana Miśhra. In the centuries after Sankara it was Maṇḍana Miśhra who was considered to be the most important representative of Vedanta. His influence was such, that some regard this work to have "set forth a non-Sankaran brand of Advaita." The "theory of error" set forth in the Brahma-siddhi became the normative Advaita Vedanta theory of error. According to Maṇḍana Miśhra, errors are opportunities because they "lead to truth", and full correct knowledge requires that not only should one understand the truth but also examine and understand errors as well as what is not truth.

His student Vachaspati Miśhra, who is believed to have been an incarnation of Shankara to popularize the Advaita view, wrote the Bhamati, a commentary on Shankara's Brahma Sutra Bhashya, and the Brahmatattva-samiksa, a commentary on Mandana Mishra's Brahma-siddhi. His thought was mainly inspired by Mandana Miśhra, and harmonises Shankara's thought with that of Mandana Miśhra. According to Advaita tradition, Shankara reincarnated as Vachaspati Miśhra "to popularise the Advaita System through his Bhamati."

Maṇḍana Miśhra's influence and status can also be discerned in a popular legend about his debate with Adi Shankara. According to legend, described in biographies of Shankara, Adi Shankara debated with Maṇḍana Miśhra. The vanquished would become a disciple of the victor and accept his school of thought. According to this legend, Sankara defeated Maṇḍana Miśhra, and as agreed, Maṇḍana became a disciple of Sankara and assumed the name Suresvaracharya. According to the Advaita Vedanta tradition, Maṇḍana Miśhra along with Hastamalaka, Padmapāda, and Totakacharya was one of the four main disciples of Sankara and was the first head of Sringeri Mutt, one of the four mathas that Shankara later established. This legend reflects the influence of Maṇḍana Miśhra, and the attempts of the later Advaita tradition to subjugate him to the position Shankara acquired in later times.

Identification with Sureśvara
Maṇḍana Miśhra has often been identified with Sureśvara. Sureśvara (fl. 800-900 CE) and Maṇḍana Miśhra were contemporaries of Shankara. A strong tradition in Hinduism states that he started life as a Mīmāmsaka, became a sannyāsin and an Advaitin after Maṇḍana Miśhra and his wife Ubhaya Bharati were defeated by Shankara in a debate and was given the yogapatta or monastic name "Sureshwara". 

According to Kuppuswami Sastri, it is not likely that Maṇḍana Miśhra, the author of Brahmasiddhi, is identical with Sureśvara, but the tradition is correct in describing Maṇḍana Miśhra and Śankara as contemporaries. His critical edition of the Brahmasiddhi also points out that the name Maṇḍana Miśhra is both a title and a first name, which is a possible cause for a confusion of personalities. Maṇḍana Miśhra's brand of Advaita differs in certain critical details from that of Śhankara, whereas Sureśvara's thought is very faithful to that of Śhankara.

According to Sharma, Hiriyanna and Kuppuswami Sastra have pointed out that Sureśvara and Maṇḍana Miśra had different views on various doctrinal points:
 The locus of avidya: according to Maṇḍana Miśhra, the individual jiva is the locus of avidya, whereas Suresvara contents that avidya regarding Brahman is located in Brahman. These two different stances are also reflected in the opposing positions of the Bhamati school and the Vivarana school.
 Liberation: according to Maṇḍana Miśhra, the knowledge which arises from the Mahavakya is insufficient for liberation. Only the direct realisation of Brahma is liberating, which can only be attained by meditation. According to Suresvara, this knowledge is directly liberating, while meditation is at best a useful aid.

R. Balasubramanian disagrees with the arguments of Kuppuswami Sastri and others, arguing that there is no conclusive evidence available to prove that Maṇḍana, the author of the Brahmasiddhi, is different from Sureśvara, the author of the Naiṣkarmyasiddhi and the Vārtikas.

References

Sources
Printed sources

 John Grimes, "Sureśvara" (in Robert L. Arrington [ed.]. A Companion to the Philosophers. Oxford: Blackwell, 2001. )
 
 
 Sarvepalli Radhakrishnan, et al. [edd], History of Philosophy Eastern and Western: Volume One (George Allen & Unwin, 1952)
 
 
 

Web-sources

Further reading
 Allen Wright Thrasher (1993), The Advaita Vedānta of Brahma-siddhi, Motilal Banarsidass Publ.

External links
Texts
 Brahma-siddhi at archive.org
 Sphota-Siddhi at archive.org
 Taittiriyopanishad Bhasya Vartika by Suresvara at archive.org
 Naishkarmya-Siddhi at archive.org
 Naishkarmya-Siddhi with Chandrika at archive.org

8th-century Indian philosophers
Advaitin philosophers
Indian Medieval linguists
Medieval Sanskrit grammarians
Philosophers of Mithila
Scholars from Bihar
Advaita Vedanta
Indian Sanskrit scholars